V419 Cephei (BD+59°2342 or HIP 104719) is an irregular variable star in the constellation of Cepheus with an apparent magnitude that varies between 6.54 and 6.89.

Distance 
It is a member of the stellar association Cepheus OB2-A.

Characteristics 
The K-band angular diameter measurements equal 5.90 ± 0.70 milliarcseconds, which leads to a figure not much higher, although the uncertainty in its distance must also be taken into account. If placed at the Sun's location, it would engulf the orbits of Mercury, Venus, Earth, Mars, and roughly half of the asteroid belt.

V419 Cephei has a mass 16.6 solar masses, above the limit beyond which stars end their lives as supernovae. The life of such massive stars is very short. Despite its advanced evolutionary state, V419 Cephei is only 10 million years old.

Billed as an irregular variable star of type LC, V419 Cephei's brightness varies between magnitudes 6.54 and 6.89 with no apparent periodicity.

References

M-type supergiants
Cepheus (constellation)
Cepehei, V419
Slow irregular variables
202380
104719
Durchmusterung objects